23S rRNA (uracil747-C5)-methyltransferase (YbjF, RumB, RNA uridine methyltransferase B) is an enzyme with systematic name S-adenosyl-L-methionine:23S rRNA (uracil747-C5)-methyltransferase. This enzyme catalyses the following chemical reaction

 S-adenosyl-L-methionine + uracil747 in 23S rRNA  S-adenosyl-L-homocysteine + 5-methyluracil747 in 23S rRNA

The enzyme specifically methylates uracil747 at C5 in 23S rRNA.

References

External links 
 

EC 2.1.1